Mustapha Ndaw (born 15 November 1981) is a Gambian international football forward.

Club career
Ndaw Begin playing still in Gambia with Real de Banjul where he was spotted by R.S.C. Anderlecht that bought him in 1999. He ended up playing mostly for the Anderlecht B team, besides the loan during the 2000-01 season to the FCV Dender EH. In 2003, he moved to the Faroe Islands where he signed with B71 Sandoy before returning to Belgium to sign with K.A.A. Gent and playing with them the 2004-05 season. In 2006, he signed with another Faroese club, B68 Toftir, before moving to Cyprus where he represented AEK Larnaca and Doxa Katokopia. In the winter break of the 2007-08 season Greek club Veria FC signed him, but after a year he returned to Cyprus this time to play with Enosis Neon Paralimni FC. After 6 months without a club he signed with Macedonian club FK Teteks in January 2010 where he played the rest of the season.

Ndaw was member of the Gambian national team.

References

External sources
 
 
 
 Stats from Macedonia at Macedonianfootball.

1981 births
Living people
Gambian footballers
The Gambia international footballers
Real de Banjul FC players
Gambian expatriate footballers
Association football forwards
F.C.V. Dender E.H. players
K.A.A. Gent players
Expatriate footballers in Belgium
Gambian expatriate sportspeople in Belgium
B71 Sandoy players
B68 Toftir players
Expatriate footballers in the Faroe Islands
AEK Larnaca FC players
Doxa Katokopias FC players
Veria F.C. players
Enosis Neon Paralimni FC players
Belgian Pro League players
Super League Greece players
Cypriot First Division players
Expatriate footballers in Greece
Expatriate footballers in Cyprus
FK Teteks players
Expatriate footballers in North Macedonia